The Vuva is a river in the north-west of the Kola Peninsula in Murmansk Oblast, Russia. It is 61 km in length. The Vuva originates in the Salnie Tundry and flows into the Verkhnetulomskoye Reservoir.

Rivers of Murmansk Oblast
Tributaries of the Tuloma